These 201 species belong to Pimpla, a genus of ichneumon wasps in the family Ichneumonidae.

Pimpla species

 Pimpla acutula (Momoi, 1973) c
 Pimpla aeola (Porter, 1970) c g
 Pimpla aequalis Provancher, 1880 c b
 Pimpla aethiops Curtis, 1828 c g
 Pimpla albipalpis Cameron, 1905 c g
 Pimpla alboannulata Uchida, 1928 c g
 Pimpla albociliata Kasparyan, 1974 c g
 Pimpla albomarginata Cameron, 1886 c g
 Pimpla alishanensis (Kusigemati, 1985) c g
 Pimpla alnorum (Porter, 1970) c g
 Pimpla amamiensis (Momoi, 1970) c g
 Pimpla amplifemura Lin, 1988 c g
 Pimpla annulipes Brullé, 1846 c g b
 Pimpla anomalensis Theobald, 1937 c g
 Pimpla apollyon Morley, 1913 c g
 Pimpla appendigera Brues, 1906 c g
 Pimpla apricaria Costa, 1885 c g
 Pimpla aquensis Theobald, 1937 c g
 Pimpla aquilonia Cresson, 1870 c g b
 Pimpla arayai Gauld, 1991 c g
 Pimpla arcadica Kasparyan, 1973 c g
 Pimpla arctica Zetterstedt, 1838 c g
 Pimpla arisana (Sonan, 1936) g
 Pimpla arjuna (Gupta & Saxena, 1987) c g
 Pimpla arnoldi Benoit, 1953 c g
 Pimpla artemonis Kasparyan, 1973 c g
 Pimpla asiatica Kasparyan, 1973 c g
 Pimpla aurimicans (Enderlein, 1921) c g
 Pimpla aviancae (Porter, 1970) c g
 Pimpla azteca Cresson, 1874 c g
 Pimpla bactriana Kasparyan, 1974 c g
 Pimpla bicolor Brullé, 1846 c g
 Pimpla bilineata (Cameron, 1900) c g
 Pimpla bistricta Morley, 1916 c g
 Pimpla bolivari (Porter, 1970) c g
 Pimpla brithys (Porter, 1970) c g
 Pimpla brumha (Gupta & Saxena, 1987) c g
 Pimpla brunnea (Gupta & Saxena, 1987) c
 Pimpla burgeoni Seyrig, 1937 c g
 Pimpla burmensis (Gupta & Saxena, 1987) c g
 Pimpla caerulea Brullé, 1846 c g
 Pimpla caeruleata Cresson, 1874 c g
 Pimpla calliphora Morley, 1914 c g
 Pimpla cameronii Dalla Torre, 1901 c g
 Pimpla canaliculata Forster, 1888 c g
 Pimpla carinifrons Cameron, 1899 c g
 Pimpla carlosi Gauld, Ugalde & Hanson, 1998 c g
 Pimpla caucasica Kasparyan, 1974 c g
 Pimpla conchyliata Tosquinet, 1896 c g
 Pimpla contemplator (Müller, 1776) c g
 Pimpla cossivora Curtis, 1826 c g
 Pimpla crocata Tosquinet, 1896 c g
 Pimpla croceipes Cresson, 1874 c g
 Pimpla croceiventris (Cresson, 1868) c g
 Pimpla curiosa Forster, 1888 c g
 Pimpla curta (Momoi, 1973) c g
 Pimpla cyanator Morley, 1914 c g
 Pimpla cyanea Szépligeti, 1908 c g
 Pimpla cyanipennis Brullé, 1846 c
 Pimpla cyclostigmata Statz, 1936 c g
 Pimpla daitojimana Sonan, 1940 c g
 Pimpla decaryi Seyrig, 1932 c g
 Pimpla decessa Scudder, 1878 c g
 Pimpla dimidiata (Townes, 1960) c g
 Pimpla disparis Viereck, 1911 c
 Pimpla distincta (Momoi, 1971) c g
 Pimpla dohrnii Ratzeburg, 1847 c g
 Pimpla dorsata (Dalla Torre, 1901) c g
 Pimpla dravida (Gupta & Saxena, 1987) c g
 Pimpla elegantissima Szepligeti, 1922 c g
 Pimpla ellopiae Harrington, 1892 c g
 Pimpla eocenica Cockerell, 1919 c g
 Pimpla ereba Cameron, 1899 c g
 Pimpla erythema (Porter, 1970) c g
 Pimpla erythromera (Momoi, 1971) c
 Pimpla exapta Forster, 1888 c g
 Pimpla experiens Forster, 1888 c g
 Pimpla exstirpator Forster, 1888 c g
 Pimpla fatua De Stefani, 1887 c g
 Pimpla femorella Kasparyan, 1974 c g
 Pimpla flavicoxis Thomson, 1877 c g
 Pimpla flavipalpis Cameron, 1899 c g
 Pimpla flavipennis (Enderlein, 1919) c g
 Pimpla fraudator Forster, 1888 c g
 Pimpla fuscipes Brullé, 1846 c g
 Pimpla garuda (Gupta & Saxena, 1987) c g
 Pimpla glandaria Costa, 1886 c g
 Pimpla golbachi (Porter, 1970) c g
 Pimpla hesperus (Townes, 1960) c g
 Pimpla himalayensis (Gupta & Saxena, 1987) c g
 Pimpla hostifera Forster, 1888 c g
 Pimpla hova Seyrig, 1932 c g
 Pimpla hubendickae Gauld, 1991 c g
 Pimpla ichneumoniformis Cresson, 1874 c g
 Pimpla illecebrator (Villers, 1789) c g
 Pimpla imitata Forster, 1888 c g
 Pimpla impuncta Lin, 1988 c g
 Pimpla indra Cameron, 1899 c g
 Pimpla indura Theobald, 1937 c g
 Pimpla inopinata Kasparyan, 1974 c g
 Pimpla insignatoria (Gravenhorst, 1807) c g
 Pimpla instigator (Miller, 1759) b
 Pimpla iothales (Porter, 1970) c g
 Pimpla isidroi Gauld, Ugalde & Hanson, 1998 c g
 Pimpla jakulicai (Porter, 1972) c g
 Pimpla javensis (Gupta & Saxena, 1987) c g
 Pimpla karakurti Rossikov, 1904 c g
 Pimpla kaszabi (Momoi, 1973) c g
 Pimpla laevifrons Forster, 1888 c g
 Pimpla lamprotes (Porter, 1970) c g
 Pimpla laothoe Cameron, 1897 c g
 Pimpla lasallei Diaz, 2000 c g
 Pimpla latistigma (Momoi, 1973) c g
 Pimpla lignicola Ratzeburg, 1852 c g
 Pimpla limitata Forster, 1888 c g
 Pimpla luctuosa Smith, 1874 c g
 Pimpla maculiscaposa Seyrig, 1932 c g
 Pimpla madecassa (Saussure, 1892) c g
 Pimpla mahalensis Gribodo, 1879 c g
 Pimpla marginella Brullé, 1846 c g b
 Pimpla maura Cresson, 1870 c g b
 Pimpla melanacrias Perkins, 1941 c g
 Pimpla meridionalis Benoit, 1956 c g
 Pimpla mitchelli Diaz, 2000 c g
 Pimpla morticina Brues, 1910 c g
 Pimpla murinanae Fahringer, 1943 c
 Pimpla nigricolor Tosquinet, 1903 c g
 Pimpla nigroaenea (Cushman, 1927) c g
 Pimpla nigrohirsuta Strobl, 1902 c g
 Pimpla nipponica Uchida, 1928 c g
 Pimpla nuda Townes, 1940 c g
 Pimpla oehlkei (Momoi, 1973) c g
 Pimpla orbitalis Ratzeburg, 1852 c g
 Pimpla oropha (Porter, 1970) c g
 Pimpla pamirica Kasparyan, 1974 c g
 Pimpla parva (Momoi, 1973) c
 Pimpla pedalis Cresson, 1865 c g b
 Pimpla pepsoides (Porter, 1970) c g
 Pimpla perssoni Gauld, 1991 c g
 Pimpla picea (Gupta & Saxena, 1987) c g
 Pimpla platysma (Porter, 1970) c g
 Pimpla pluto Ashmead, 1906 c g
 Pimpla polychroma (Cushman, 1927) c g
 Pimpla praesecta Forster, 1888 c g
 Pimpla processioneae Ratzeburg, 1849 c g
 Pimpla punicipes Cresson, 1874 c g b
 Pimpla pyramis (Porter, 1970) c g
 Pimpla ramirezi (Porter, 1970) c g
 Pimpla rasilis (Momoi, 1973) c g
 Pimpla rediviva Brues, 1910 c g
 Pimpla renevieri Meunier, 1903 c g
 Pimpla revelata Brues, 1910 c g
 Pimpla rojasi Gauld, 1991 c g
 Pimpla romeroi Gauld, 1991 c g
 Pimpla rubripes Holmgren, 1868 c
 Pimpla rufonigra Cresson, 1865 c g
 Pimpla russula (Gupta & Saxena, 1987) c g
 Pimpla sanguinipes Cresson, 1872 c g b
 Pimpla saussurei Heer, 1856 c g
 Pimpla sedula Cameron, 1886 c g
 Pimpla segnestami Gauld, 1991 c g
 Pimpla semirufa Brullé, 1846 c g
 Pimpla semitibialis (Gupta & Saxena, 1987) c g
 Pimpla senecta Scudder, 1878 c g
 Pimpla senilis Brues, 1910 c g
 Pimpla seyrigi Theobald, 1937 c g
 Pimpla shiva (Gupta & Saxena, 1987) c g
 Pimpla silvicola Walley, 1941 c g
 Pimpla sodalis Ruthe, 1859 c g b
 Pimpla sondrae Gauld, Ugalde & Hanson, 1998 c g
 Pimpla sordidella Holmgren, 1868 c g
 Pimpla sparsa (Porter, 1970) c g
 Pimpla spectabilis Szépligeti, 1908 c g
 Pimpla speculifera Forster, 1888 c g
 Pimpla spilopteris (Momoi, 1973) c g
 Pimpla spuria Gravenhorst, 1829 c g
 Pimpla stangei (Porter, 1970) c g
 Pimpla stigmatica Henriksen, 1922 c g
 Pimpla stricklandi (Townes, 1960) c
 Pimpla strigipleuris Thomson, 1877 c g
 Pimpla succini Giebel, 1856 c g
 Pimpla sumichrasti Cresson, 1874 c g
 Pimpla tafiae (Porter, 1970) c g
 Pimpla taihokensis Uchida, 1930 c g
 Pimpla taprobanae Cameron, 1897 c g
 Pimpla tarapacae (Porter, 1970) c g
 Pimpla tenuicornis Cresson, 1865 c g
 Pimpla thoracica Morley, 1914 c g
 Pimpla tomyris Schrottky, 1902 c g
 Pimpla trichroa (Porter, 1970) c g
 Pimpla tuberculata Morley, 1914 c
 Pimpla turionellae (Linnaeus, 1758) c g b
 Pimpla vangeli Diaz, 2000 c g
 Pimpla varians (Townes, 1960) c g
 Pimpla varipes (Porter, 1970) c g
 Pimpla vayonae Diaz, 2000 c g
 Pimpla viridescens Morley, 1914 c g
 Pimpla vumbana Benoit, 1953 c g
 Pimpla waterloti Seyrig, 1932 c g
 Pimpla wilchristi Fitton, Shaw & Gauld, 1988 c g
 Pimpla yungarum (Porter, 1970) c g

Data sources: i = ITIS, c = Catalogue of Life, g = GBIF, b = Bugguide.net

References

Pimpla